Infestation is a 2009 horror-comedy film  by American writer/director Kyle Rankin. It was produced by Mel Gibson's Icon Entertainment and starring Chris Marquette, E. Quincy Sloan, Brooke Nevin, Kinsey Packard, Deborah Geffner and Ray Wise. It was filmed in Bulgaria.

Plot
Cooper (Chris Marquette) is a slacker who works as a telemarketer. On a Friday, he turns up late for work and is promptly fired by his boss, Maureen (Deborah Geffner). He is fired for coming late, driving customers away, and fooling around in the office. Shortly after, an extremely loud sound is heard and Cooper faints with pained expressions on his face.

Cooper wakes up a few days later, only to find himself nauseous, weak and covered in webbing (cocooned) in his office. As Cooper struggles out of the cocoon, he is attacked by a big, beetle-like, bug. He fights the bug away and helps Maureen out of a cocoon. Maureen regains consciousness and realizes that her daughter, Sara (Brooke Nevin) was waiting for her outside the office. Cooper and Maureen go outside to check on Sara, who is unconscious and trapped inside a cocoon in her car. As Cooper is helping Sara out of the cocoon, Maureen is attacked and captured by a large, wasp-like creature. Other bugs surround them and they use Sara's car alarm to distract the bugs and escape to a restaurant.

There they revive Cindy (Kinsey Packard), Hugo (E. Quincy Sloan), Hugo's father Albert (Wesley Thompson), Leechee (Linda Park), Roger (Bru Muller), PJ (Vlado Mihailov) and a Cop (Todd Jenson). PJ and Roger decide to escape in Roger's truck against the advice of others. They are attacked by the bugs and in the chaos PJ, Roger and the cop are killed. Albert is stung by a bug, while Cooper saves Cindy from being crushed by Roger's runaway truck, with the rest of the group deciding to stay indoors.

Leechee and the group make their way to roof of a building and see a group of the wasps flying toward them. The group then realize that the bugs are blind and they use sound to track their victims, as the wasps did not attack them. They use a radio to lure a bug in a storage closet and milk it to identify the contents of its venom. Leechee analyses the venom and realizes that it contains sedatives and some proteins. They decide to go to the nearest military airbase at Gibson the next day and decide to camp for the night in the same building. They also see the bug hive, which is emitting red colored gas. The next day, the group leave the building to make their way to Cooper's dad, while Leechee decides to stay behind to help revive more people and to study the bugs.

The rest of the group sets off and goes to Hugo's and Albert's house first. Albert's wife seems to have died of natural causes. They next go to Cindy's brother, Chad's (Mike Straub) house. Cindy finds her sister-in-law Susan (Daniela Tonova) cocooned and she revives her. They also find Chad, who has mutated into a large spider-like creature because of a giant wasp sting. Chad is collecting cocooned humans and he attacks the group, killing Susan, knocking out Sara, impaling Cooper when he tries to save Cindy and is finally killed by Hugo and Albert.

They camp for the night at Chad's house and Sara patches up Cooper. Cindy wants Cooper to ditch the group and come with her but Cooper is in love with Sara and he turns down the offer. The next day they decide to go to Cooper's dad, Ethan's (Ray Wise) house. Ethan is a former military personnel who has weapons and a bunker at his house. Sara informs Cooper that she intends to go to the bug hive to find her mother. Cooper tries to convince her to come with him to a military airbase but she doesn't agree. They come across a few flying bugs and hide under a bridge. Cindy sees Cooper and Sara holding hands, becomes furious, and shouts to attract the bugs towards the group. Albert shoots Cindy to save the group but Sara is captured by the bugs. Finally the group reaches Ethan's house and Albert turns into a mutant, similar to Chad. Hugo shoots his father to save himself, Ethan, and Cooper.

Cooper tries to convince Ethan to help him save Sara but when he fails he leaves Ethan and Hugo behind. Cooper is captured by another group and they lock him up in a prison cell in an abandoned police station. There he meets a Puerto Rican man, who tells him that he was part of Leechee's group and that he thinks the others died in the explosion caused by the flammable red colored gas released by the bugs and the nest. Hugo and Ethan are captured by the same group. It is revealed that Ethan has been stung by a wasp and the Puerto Rican man turns into a mutant. Ethan uses the distraction to kill the members of the enemy group and save Cooper and Hugo.

Meanwhile, Sara wakes up in the bug hive and comes across the queen consuming cocooned humans. Ethan, Hugo and Cooper reach the hive. Ethan hand-cuffs Cooper to a tree and hits Hugo in the head. He leaves the keys so that Cooper and Hugo can escape. Ethan enters the hive alone to destroy it and he comes across Sara. Sara offers to take Ethan to the queen. Ethan and Sara are then attacked by the queen. Hugo and Cooper enter the bug hive, arriving in time to help Sara and Ethan. The group begin to attack the queen with their weapons. This only angers the queen, who begins to wail loudly. As the group cower in pain at the volume of the wail, Hugo, who was unable to hear the wail as he had lost his hearing, throws the explosives into queens mouth. Ethan asks Sara, Cooper and Hugo to escape from the bug hive while he triggers the explosive. But soon after, Ethan turns into a mutant. Cooper takes the remote from his father and triggers the explosive, obliterating the nest and the insects inside.

The film ends with Cooper, Sara and Hugo turning toward the sound of a large rumbling. The source of this rumbling is not specified as the film then turns to black in a cliffhanger.

Cast

Possible sequel
Director Kyle Rankin and lead actor Chris Marquette, signed 3-picture contracts with Icon Films for a potential trilogy of this storyline.

References

External links
 
 

American comedy horror films
2009 films
2009 horror films
2009 comedy-drama films
American comedy-drama films
Films about insects
Films produced by Bruce Davey
Films shot in Bulgaria
Icon Productions films
Syfy original films
Films directed by Kyle Rankin
Films with screenplays by Kyle Rankin
American drama television films
2000s English-language films
2000s American films
Films set in bunkers